Levino is a rural locality (a village) in Porechenskoye Rural Settlement, Vashkinsky District, Vologda Oblast, Russia. The population was 4 as of 2002.

Geography 
Levino is located 54 km northwest of Lipin Bor (the district's administrative centre) by road. Bonga is the nearest rural locality.

References 

Rural localities in Vashkinsky District